Austrarchaea woodae is a species of spider in the family Archaeidae. It is commonly known as the Mount Bartle Frere Assassin Spider as the holotype male was found at Mount Bartle Frere in the Wooroonooran National Park. It was named to honour Hannah M. Wood and is endemic to Queensland, Australia.

References 

Spiders described in 2012
Archaeidae